Private Henry James Tandey VC, DCM, MM (born Tandy, 30 August 1891 – 20 December 1977) was a British recipient of the Victoria Cross, the highest award for gallantry in the face of the enemy that can be awarded to British and Commonwealth forces. He was the second most highly decorated British private of the First World War and is most commonly remembered as the soldier who allegedly spared Adolf Hitler's life during the war. Born with the family name of Tandy, he later changed his surname to Tandey after problems with his father, and because of this, some military records have a different spelling of his name.

Early life
Henry James Tandey was born at the Angel Hotel, Regent Street, Leamington, Warwickshire, the son of a former soldier whose wife had died early in their child's life. He attended St. Peters' primary school in Augusta Place, Leamington. He also spent part of his childhood in an orphanage before becoming a boiler attendant at a hotel.

Military service
Tandey enlisted into the Green Howards Regiment on 12 August 1907. After basic training he was posted to their 2nd Battalion on 23 January 1908, serving with them in Guernsey and South Africa prior to the outbreak of World War I. He took part in the Battle of Ypres in October 1914, and was wounded on 24 October 1916, at the Battle of the Somme. On discharge from hospital he was posted to the 3rd Battalion on 5 May 1917, before moving to the 9th Battalion on 11 June 1917. He was wounded a second time on 27 November 1917, during the Battle of Passchendaele. After his 2nd period of hospital treatment he returned to the 3rd Battalion, on 23 January 1918, before being posted to the 12th Battalion on 15 March 1918, where he remained until 26 July 1918. On 26 July 1918 Tandey transferred from the Green Howards to The Duke of Wellington's (West Riding Regiment). He was posted to their 5th Battalion on 27 July 1918.

Distinguished Conduct Medal
On 28 August 1918, during the 2nd Battle of Cambrai, the 5th Battalion was in action to the west of the Canal du Nord. Tandey was in charge of one of several bombing parties on the German trenches. As the forward parties were being held up Tandey took two men and dashed across open ground (No man's land) under fire and bombed a trench. He returned with twenty prisoners. This action led to the capture of the German positions and Tandey was awarded the Distinguished Conduct Medal (DCM) on 5 December 1918, the citation read:

On 12 September, the 5th Battalion was involved in an attack at Havrincourt, where Tandey again distinguished himself. Having rescued several wounded men under fire the previous day, Tandey again led a bombing party into the German trenches, returning with more prisoners. For this action Tandey was awarded the Military Medal (MM) on 13 March 1919.

Victoria Cross
Tandey was 27 years old and a private in the 5th Battalion Duke of Wellington's (West Riding) Regiment when he performed the actions which earned him the Victoria Cross (VC).

On 28 September 1918, during a counter-attack at the canal, following the capture of Marcoing, France, his platoon was stopped by machine-gun fire. Tandey crawled forward, located the gun position and with a Lewis gun team, silenced it. Reaching the canal crossing, he restored the plank bridge under heavy fire. In the evening, he and eight comrades were surrounded by an overwhelming number of the enemy. Tandey led a bayonet charge, fighting so fiercely that 37 of the enemy were driven into the hands of the remainder of his company. Although twice wounded, Tandey refused to leave until the fight was won, eventually going into hospital for the third time on 4 October 1918.

An eyewitness, Private H Lister, recounted the episode:

His VC was gazetted on 14 December 1918, the citation read:

Encounter with Adolf Hitler
Although disputed, Adolf Hitler and Tandey allegedly encountered each other at the French village of Marcoing. The story is set on 28 September 1918, while Tandey was serving with the 5th Duke of Wellington's Regiment, and relates that a weary German soldier wandered into Tandey's line of fire. The enemy was wounded and did not appear to have a weapon. Tandey chose not to shoot. The German soldier saw him lower his rifle and nodded his thanks before wandering off. That soldier is purported to have been Adolf Hitler. The author David Johnson, who wrote a book on Henry Tandey, believes this story was an urban legend.

In some versions, Hitler allegedly saw a newspaper report about Tandey being awarded the VC (in October 1918, whilst serving with the 5th Battalion Duke of Wellington's (West Riding) Regiment), recognised him, and clipped the article.

In 1937, Hitler was made aware of a particular Fortunino Matania painting by Dr Otto Schwend, a member of his staff. Schwend had been a medical officer during the First Battle of Ypres in 1914. He had been sent a copy of the painting by a Lieutenant Colonel Earle in 1936. Earle had been treated by Schwend in a medical post at the Menin Crossroads and they remained in touch after the war.

The painting was commissioned by the Green Howards Regiment from the Italian artist in 1923, showing a soldier purported to be Tandey carrying a wounded man at the Kruiseke Crossroads in 1914, northwest of Menin. The painting was made from a sketch, provided to Matania, by the regiment, based on an actual event at that crossroads. A building shown behind Tandey in the painting belonged to the Van Den Broucke family, who were presented with a copy of the painting by the Green Howard's Regiment.

Schwend obtained a large photo of the painting to gift it to Hitler. Captain Weidemann, Hitler's adjutant, wrote the following response:

Apparently Hitler identified the soldier carrying the wounded man as Tandey from the photo of him in the newspaper clipping he had obtained in 1918.

In 1938, when Neville Chamberlain visited Hitler at his alpine retreat, the Berghof, for the discussions that led to the Munich Agreement, he noticed the painting and asked about it. Hitler replied: That man came so near to killing me that I thought I should never see Germany again; Providence saved me from such devilishly accurate fire as those English boys were aiming at us.

According to the story, Hitler asked Chamberlain to convey his best wishes and gratitude to Tandey. Chamberlain promised to phone Tandey in person on his return, which apparently he did. The Cadbury Research Centre, which holds copies of Chamberlain's papers and diaries, has no references relating to Tandey from the records of the 1938 meeting. The story further states that the phone was answered by a nine-year-old child called William Whateley. William was related to Tandey's wife Edith. However, Tandey at that time lived at 22 Cope Street, Coventry, and worked for the Triumph Motor Company. According to the company records, they only had three phone lines, none of which was at Tandey's address. British Telecommunications archive records also have no telephones registered to that address in 1938.

Historical research throws serious doubts on whether the incident actually ever occurred. Hitler took his second leave from military service on 10 September 1918 for 18 days. This means that he was in Germany on the presumed date of the facts.

Post-war service
On 13 March 1919 a supplement to the London Gazette announced that Tandey had been awarded the Military Medal (MM). The following day he was discharged from service and only one day later he re-enlisted into the Duke of Wellington's 3rd Battalion on a 'Short Service Engagement'. Three days later (18 March 1919) he was promoted to acting lance corporal. He remained with the 3rd Battalion on 'Home Service' until 4 February 1921, when he transferred to the 2nd Battalion. Four days later on 8 February 1921 he requested to revert to the rank of private.

Tandey served with the 2nd Battalion in Gibraltar from 11 April 1922 to 18 February 1923, in Turkey from 19 February – 23 August 1923 and finally in Egypt from 24 August 1923 until 29 September 1925. He was finally discharged from the army on 5 January 1926.

In addition to his major awards Tandey had also been Mentioned in Despatches on five occasions. He was personally decorated by King George V at Buckingham Palace on 17 December 1919.

Post-war years

Tandey returned to Leamington Spa and married. In 1940, during the Coventry Blitz, his home was bombed by the Luftwaffe. A journalist approached him outside his bombed Coventry home, asking him about his alleged encounter with Hitler. "If only I had known what he would turn out to be," Tandey is quoted as saying. "When I saw all the people and women and children he had killed and wounded I was sorry to God I let him go." However, there is no evidence, not even anecdotal, he was either hounded or avoided after the claims.

Tandey became a commissionaire at the Standard Triumph Works, Fletchamstead a position he held for 38 years.

Tandey died in 1977, childless, at the age of 86. At his request, he was cremated and his ashes buried in the Masnieres British Cemetery at Marcoing, France, on 23 May 1978, by his undertaker Pargetter and Son. Due to French laws it was not permissible for his ashes to be scattered, or any form of ceremony or commemoration made to him.

Henry Tandey Court, on Union Road, in Leamington Spa, is named after him. It was originally a workshop and builders yard of Mr. G.F.Smith, who built St. Marks Church and Vicarage.

A blue plaque was installed outside the Angel Hotel where Henry Tandey was born and at St Peter's School.

Medals
Tandey donated his medals to the Duke of Wellington's Regiment Museum in Halifax, West Yorkshire. On special occasions and parades he would sign them out to wear. During the last period that he had signed them out, he died. Unaware that the medals should have been returned to the museum, the medals were auctioned at Sotheby's in London by his wife and a private collector subsequently purchased them. They were presented to the Green Howards Regimental Museum (the regiment in which he had earlier served), by Sir Ernest Harrison OBE, at a ceremony in the Tower of London on 11 November 1997, twenty years after Tandey died.

A copy of Tandey's Victoria Cross is now displayed at the Green Howards Regimental Museum in Richmond, North Yorkshire. Along with others, the original VC is kept in a local bank vault.

On 6 June 2006 The Green Howards and the Duke of Wellington's (West Riding) Regiment amalgamated with the Prince of Wales's Own Regiment of Yorkshire to form the Yorkshire Regiment.

Notes

References

 General
Monuments to Courage (David Harvey, 1999)
The Register of the Victoria Cross (This England, 1997)
VCs of the First World War - The Final Days 1918 (Gerald Gliddon, 2000)

External links
Location of grave and VC medal (Warwickshire)
How a Right Can Make A Wrong (First World War Article, an Urban Myth – see this article's Talk Page)

1891 births
1977 deaths
People from Leamington Spa
Duke of Wellington's Regiment soldiers
British Army personnel of World War I
British World War I recipients of the Victoria Cross
British people of World War II
Recipients of the Distinguished Conduct Medal
Recipients of the Military Medal
Green Howards soldiers
British Army recipients of the Victoria Cross
Burials at Masnieres British Cemetery
Military personnel from Warwickshire